The Taipei Qin Hall is a former residence in Qidong Street, Zhongzheng District, Taipei, Taiwan.

History
The building was established by Chinese Guqin Association and constructed around 1920 until 1940 during the Japanese rule of Taiwan.
The building was then used as the official residence for Japanese public servants. The building has been designated as historical building by Taipei City Government.

Transportation
The building is accessible within walking distance west of Zhongxiao Xinsheng Station of Taipei Metro.

See also
 List of tourist attractions in Taiwan

References

External links
  

Houses in Taiwan
Buildings and structures in Taipei
Tourist attractions in Taipei